Frank Bernard "Flip" Lafferty (May 4, 1854 – February 2, 1910) was a Major League Baseball player. He played parts of two seasons in the majors.

In , Lafferty appeared in one game as a pitcher for the Philadelphia Athletics. Despite not giving up any earned runs, he gave up three unearned runs and lost the game, leaving him with an 0–1 record despite an ERA of 0.00.

In , Lafferty moved on to the Louisville Grays, where he appeared in four games in center field. He managed just one hit (a double) in 17 at bats, for a batting average of .059, placing his career average at .050.

He died on February 8, 1910, and was interred at Wilmington and Brandywine Cemetery in Wilmington, Delaware.

References

Sources

Major League Baseball pitchers
Major League Baseball center fielders
Philadelphia Athletics (NL) players
Louisville Grays players
Pittsburgh Allegheny players
Baseball players from Pennsylvania
Sportspeople from Scranton, Pennsylvania
19th-century baseball players
1854 births
1910 deaths
Burials at Wilmington and Brandywine Cemetery